Royal Trust Bank v Buchler [1989] BCLC 130 is a UK insolvency law case, which decided that before a creditor may enforce security, it must show it is appropriate to do so.

Facts
Mr Buchler's company borrowed £500,000 from Royal Trust Bank. It purchased and refurbished some property to let it out again. The loan was secured by a charge entitling the bank to appoint a receiver. When an administrator was appointed, he decided it would be best to go ahead letting the property and then sell. Letting failed. The administrator decided to sell. The property got £850,000, and the bank sought leave under the Insolvency Act 1986 s.11(3) (see now, Schedule B) to enforce its security.

Judgment
Peter Gibson J refused the bank leave. He held the bank failed to discharge its burden of showing a proper case to enforce security. The decision to delay the property's sale was a sound one, and if it was sold the bank could be paid in full. If the bank was allowed to appoint a receiver, costs would be increased, which would decrease assets available to all creditors.

See also
UK insolvency law

Notes

United Kingdom insolvency case law
1989 in case law
1989 in British law